2016 Blaublitz Akita season. The annual club slogan was "躍".

Squad
As of 2016.

J3 League

Standings

Emperor's Cup

Other games

Gallery

References

External links
 J.League official site

Blaublitz Akita
Blaublitz Akita seasons